Bindweed may refer to:

 Some species of Convolvulaceae (bindweed family or morning glory family):
 Calystegia (bindweed, false bindweed, morning glory), a genus of about 25 species of flowering plants
 Convolvulus (bindweed, morning glory), a genus of about 250 species of flowering plants
 Polymeria calycina, slender bindweed, native to Australia
 Dioscorea communis, black bindweed
 Fallopia convolvulus, black bindweed, a fast-growing annual flowering plant
 Solanum dulcamara, blue bindweed